Connors may refer to:

People
 Connors (surname), list of people with this name

Places
Connors, New Brunswick, Canada
Connor's Mill, Toodyay, Western Australia
Connors Road, Edmonton, Canada
Connors State College, Warner, Oklahoma, United States
Connorsville, Wisconsin, United States
13700 Connors, an asteroid

See also
 Conners (surname), list of people with this name
Connor (disambiguation)
Conner (disambiguation)